The 2005–06 season was the 27th season of the Football Conference.

Overview
This season saw the return of Accrington Stanley (albeit as a reformed club) and Hereford United to the Football League. Accrington replaced Oxford United, who had replaced them when they resigned from the League in 1962.

Northwich Victoria, Stafford Rangers and Weymouth returned to the Conference National, the latter for the first time since 1989, whilst St Albans City won promotion to the fifth tier for the first time.

As with the previous season, Grays Athletic were the winners of the FA Trophy.

Conference National

A total of 22 teams contested the division, including 17 sides from last season, two relegated from the Football League Two, two promoted from the Conference North and one promoted from the Conference South.

Promotion and relegation
Teams promoted from 2004–05 Conference North
 Southport
 Altrincham

Teams promoted from 2004–05 Conference South
 Grays Athletic

Teams relegated from 2004–05 Football League Two
 Kidderminster Harriers
 Cambridge United

League table

Locations

Results

Play-offs

Top scorers in order of league goals

Source:

Conference North

A total of 22 teams contested the division, including 17 sides from last season, one promoted from Southern Football League, two promoted from the Northern Premier League and two relegated from the Conference National.

Promotion and relegation
Teams promoted from 2004–05 Northern Premier League
 Hyde United
 Workington

Teams promoted from 2004–05 Southern Football League
 Hednesford Town

Teams relegated from 2004–05 Conference National
 Northwich Victoria
 Leigh RMI

League table

Locations

Results

Play-offs

Topscorers

Source:

Conference South

A total of 22 teams contested the division, including 18 sides from last season, two promoted from the Isthmian League, one promoted from the Southern Football League and one relegated from Conference National.

Promotion and relegation
Teams promoted from 2004–05 Southern Football League
 Histon

Teams promoted from 2004–05 Isthmian League
 Yeading
 Eastleigh

Teams relegated from 2004–05 Conference National
 Farnborough Town

League table

Locations

Results

Play-offs

Topscorers

Source:

References

External links
Nationwide Conference

 
National League (English football) seasons
5
English